Khol Hi-Raitan Wildlife Sanctuary is situated in Panchkula district of Haryana State, India.

History
Forests Department, Haryana of Government of Haryana officially notified this as Wildlife Sanctuary on 10 December 2004.

Area
It is spread over an area of 4883 (2226.58 and 2656.38) hectares. In addition, there is 1320 hectares Eco-sensitive zone around the sanctuary.

Animals
Khol Hi-Raitan Wildlife Sanctuary and Bir Shikargah Wildlife Sanctuary are only  aerial distance from each other, both are also only few km away from Kalesar National Park, all of which lie in the Shivalik hills of Haryana. All these three sanctuaries have similar species of wild animal
that migrate from century to another. The wild species include Indian leopard, Asiatic elephant, Chital (spotted deer), Sambar deer, Wild boar, Rhesus macaque, Gray langur, Striped hyena, Indian jackal, Jungle cat, Indian gray mongoose, Indian fox and Indian jackal.

Nearby attractions

See also
 List of National Parks & Wildlife Sanctuaries of Haryana, India
 Haryana Tourism
 List of Monuments of National Importance in Haryana
 List of State Protected Monuments in Haryana
 List of Indus Valley Civilization sites in Haryana, Punjab, Rajasthan, Gujarat, India & Pakistan

References

Wildlife sanctuaries in Haryana
Tourist attractions in Panchkula district
2004 establishments in Haryana
Protected areas established in 2004